Cédric Makekula Muendele Mitu (born 14 January 1995) is a Congolese professional footballer who plays as a forward for Sint-Eloois-Winkel. His first football club was SKV Overmere.

Career
Mitu made his first appearance in the Belgian Pro League for Lokeren on 8 December 2012 against KV Mechelen, after a substitution.

Between 2016 and 2020, Mitu played for Eendracht Aalst. In April 2020, he moved to Londerzeel.

In January 2021, Mitu signed with Sint-Eloois-Winkel. He made his debut for the club on 31 October 2021, coming on as a late substitute for Nagim Amini in a 1–1 draw against RFC Liège in the third-tier Belgian National Division 1.

References

1995 births
Living people
Democratic Republic of the Congo footballers
Democratic Republic of the Congo expatriate footballers
Association football forwards
K.S.C. Lokeren Oost-Vlaanderen players
S.V. Zulte Waregem players
S.C. Eendracht Aalst players
Sint-Eloois-Winkel Sport players
Belgian Pro League players
Belgian Third Division players
Democratic Republic of the Congo expatriate sportspeople in Belgium
Expatriate footballers in Belgium
21st-century Democratic Republic of the Congo people